This is a list of songs released for sale from the show American Idol, consisting of recordings of coronation songs by winners and runners-up of the show, live and studio recordings by contestants, songs from the American Idol CDs, as well as special singles released by the show such as those for Idol Gives Back and specially-recorded boot songs.  Songs released by Idol alumni in post-Idol career are not included here. See American Idol alumni single sales for a list of some of those releases.

In the first few seasons, songs were released as physical CD single which may contain one cover song and one original song. However, after Season 5 physical singles were no longer released, and songs were available only as digital downloads starting Season 6. The digital downloads were only available initially via American Idol official website during the season towards the end of Season 5 and all the final rounds of Season 6, but were then made available from iTunes after the Season 6 ended.  In all subsequent seasons all performances were made available in iTunes during the season and after the season has ended.

The digital songs sold during the season were not eligible to chart, and their sales figures were not released. Any number listed for those songs would be solely based on units sold after the finale.

All Hot 100 singles
The following Idol songs have charted on the Billboard Hot 100 chart.

Bubbling Under Hot 100 singles
The following songs failed to reach the Hot 100, but managed to make the Bubbling Under Hot 100 Singles charts.

Year-End Hot 100 singles
The following songs ranked in the Year-End charts for the Billboard Hot 100.

Send-off songs
Starting Season 5, when contestants in the final rounds are eliminated, a video of their journey through the contest was shown, accompanied by a song as a send-off. The song is also commonly called the "boot song".

References

Hot 100
American Idol